Lode Runner is a 2D puzzle-platform game, developed by Doug Smith and published by Broderbund in 1983. Its gameplay mechanics are similar to Space Panic from 1980. The player controls a character who must collect all the gold pieces in a level and get to the end while being chased by a number of enemies. It is one of the first games to include a level editor.

After the original game, a number of remakes, spin-offs and sequels were published in the Lode Runner series for different computers and consoles, and by different developers and publishers. Tozai Games holds the copyright and trademark rights.

Gameplay

The player controls a stick figure who must collect all the gold in a level while avoiding guards who try to catch the player. After collecting all the gold, the player must reach the top of the screen to reach the next level. There are 150 levels in the game, which progressively challenge players' problem-solving abilities or reaction times.

Levels have a multi-story, brick platform motif, with ladders and suspended hand-to-hand bars that offer multiple ways to travel. Guards can pick up gold bars by running over them, but any individual guard may carry no more than one bar at a time. The player can dig holes into floors to temporarily trap guards and may safely walk atop any who have fallen into holes. Should a guard be carrying a bar of gold when he falls into a hole, he will drop it and the player can pick it up. Holes dug by the player fill themselves in after a short delay. A trapped guard who cannot escape a hole before it fills is consumed, immediately respawning in a random location at the top of the level. Unlike guards, the player's character may not climb up out of a hole, and will be killed if it fills before he can escape by other means. Floors may contain trapdoors, through which the player and guards will fall, and bedrock, through which the player cannot dig.

The player can dig a hole only to either side of his position and may not dig directly beneath his own feet. In order to dig through multiple layers of bricks, the player must create a gap whose width is at least equal to the number of layers. However, exceptions to this rule arise when the player digs from the position of standing on a ladder, or hanging from a hand-to-hand bar, which allows the player to repeatedly dig and descend one row. This kind of digging is involved in solving many of the levels.

The player starts with five lives; each level completion awards an extra life. Should a guard catch the player, one life is subtracted, and the current level restarts. The player's character can fall from arbitrary heights without any injury but cannot jump, and players can trap themselves in pits from which the only escape is to abort the level, costing a life, and begin again.

Enemy AI

The guards do not always take the shortest path to the player, but can also move in counterintuitive ways. Sometimes, when the player and a guard are on the same ladder, for instance, the guard will move away from the player. In general, depending on their exact positioning relative to Lode Runner, the guards sometimes appear to be repelled. Mastering the game involves developing the intuition to predict the movement of the guards.

Permitted contact
The player may come into contact with a guard directly from above, with the stick figure's feet touching the guard's head. This is what enables the player to walk over guards who are temporarily stuck in a hole that has been dug. It is also possible to make this contact while both the guard and the player are in free fall, since the player not only runs faster than the guards, but also falls faster; moreover, it is possible to survive the feet-to-head contact while a guard is standing on a platform and begins to move. Both forms of contact are necessary to solve some levels. Sometimes it is necessary to liberate a trapped guard by digging while standing on his head, but then moving rapidly in the opposite direction when the guard begins marching to freedom. In a few levels, it is necessary to use a falling guard as a bridge to reach an otherwise unreachable area. One subtlety is that if a down movement is initiated while standing on a guard's head, or briefly touching the guard's head during free fall, the consequences are fatal.

Trapping and using guards
In some levels, guards can be deliberately trapped in various ways. For instance, they can be lured into entering a part of the level from which there is no escape. In some situations, the player can liberate trapped guards by digging them out. In some levels, to collect some gold pieces, the player must exploit the guards into collecting gold pieces, because they are positioned such that whichever figure collects them will become trapped. When the guard collects the piece and becomes trapped, the player can release the guard and then later steal the gold when the guard drops it or falls into a hole.

In some levels, there are gold pieces which can be collected only by killing guards by trapping them in dug holes which close up. Deceased guards come back to life from locations near the top of the screen, which may allow them to reach parts of the level that cannot be reached by the player.

Traversal orders
Some levels require careful ordering of traversal, because they are divided into zones connected by passages which are impossible to traverse in the reverse direction. If a gold piece remains in an unreachable zone, the player may have to abort the level to start again, losing a life, unless there is a way to coax a guard into bringing the gold.

Timing
Some of the game's puzzles in the advanced levels are time-sensitive. The player must dig in order to penetrate the interior of some cavern to collect gold, and quickly return the same way before the digging repairs itself, enclosing Lode Runner in that cavern with no means of escape.

Some puzzles require deliberate timing among the digging actions because Lode Runner must run over previously dug-out tiles that have just repaired themselves, while having enough time to pass through ones which have not yet repaired.

Development
Around late 1980, high school student James Bratsanos heard from a friend about a new arcade video game, Space Panic by Universal, which involves climbing platforms and ladders while digging holes to trap monsters. Bratsanos was intrigued by his friend's description of the concept, and wanted to develop it further. He began writing a Commodore PET program called Suicide, using simple text-based graphics. Due to his lack of programming experience, there were no pre-programmed levels, but he instead built "an engine that could interpret a game level and then run a processing loop on the monsters". This novel design later evolved into the concept of a level editor.

At the University of Washington in 1981, Bratsanos met two other students, architecture student Douglas E. Smith and Tracy Steinbeck. Following the release of Nintendo's arcade platformer Donkey Kong that year, the three students began working on a program called Kong, which evolved the concepts of Suicide. Bratsanos later left the project to pursue his studies, and Smith continued to develop Kong into the prototype of what later became Lode Runner. Kong was written for a Prime Computer 550 minicomputer limited to one building on the UW campus. Kong was soon ported to VAX minicomputers, which had more terminals available on campus. The game was programmed in Fortran using ASCII character graphics. When Kong was ported to the VAX, some Pascal sections were mixed into the original Fortran code.

Over one weekend in 1982, Smith recreated a crude, playable version in 6502 assembly language on an Apple II+ and renamed the game Miner. Through the end of the year, he refined that version, which was black-and-white with no joystick support. He submitted a rough version to Broderbund around October 1982 and received a one-line rejection letter in response to the effect of "Thank you for submitting your game concept. Unfortunately, it does not fit within our product line."

Miner, like its text-based Kong predecessors, had only simple animation where characters move across the screen in block increments. It was too primitive for an acceptable commercial product as Broderbund wanted detailed pixel-level movement. Smith's new game would be one of the first to include a level editor for user generated content, allowing players to create levels for the game. Smith was given a $10,000 advance by Broderbund to develop the inter-square animation, and to provide 150 levels of play. In a 2010 interview, game designer John Romero claimed that Smith added the level editing function at the request of neighborhood kids he had testing the game, and "a ton" of the levels they designed ended up in the final game. Smith borrowed money to purchase a color monitor and joystick and continued to improve the game. Around Christmas of 1982, he submitted the game, renamed Lode Runner, to four publishers and received offers from all four: Sierra, Sirius, Synergistic, and Broderbund. He took the deal with Broderbund.

Release and ports

Lode Runner was originally released on June 23, 1983. The original microcomputer versions were for the Apple II, Atari 8-bit family, VIC-20, Commodore 64, IBM PC. The VIC-20 version was released on cartridge, including the level editor. The Commodore 64 had both a disk and cartridge release, with the latter having 32 levels. The IBM PC port was originally on a self-booting disk and is incompatible with video cards other than CGA. A 1986 MS-DOS release runs on any video card.

The Famicom version was released by Hudson Soft in 1984 (North American NES release in 1986) and became one of the earliest third-party games made for that system. It has 50 levels, scrolling screens, added music, and graphics redone in a more cartoon-like style. In addition, fruits and vegetables randomly appear which may be grabbed for additional points. A level editor was included, which in Japan used the Famicom's Family BASIC tape drive to save one's work; however, as with many US localisations, the NES lacked the tape drive and thus there is no way to save levels created with the US release. An arcade game of Lode Runner was produced with some added features like the ability to hang off the ends of ladders and an improved enemy AI.

A port for the Macintosh 128K followed in January 1985; it runs on machines up to OS 6 and can be used on System 7 with a patch. Other versions include those for the Atari ST, ZX Spectrum, a licensed version for MSX published by ASCII Corporation, SG-1000, Windows 3.1x, and Game Boy.

Broderbund released an enhanced version, Championship Lode Runner, in 1985, with 50 levels and a higher difficulty. The company offered a commemorative certificate to anyone who could submit proof of having beaten the game (and submitted proof of purchase to show that their copy of the game was not pirated). It was ported to the Apple, Atari, C64, MSX, and IBM PC, as well as the NES (although that version did not reach North America).

The Atari 8-bit version of Lode Runner was converted to cartridge and re-released by Atari Corporation in 1987, as one of the series of releases for the Atari XEGS console. This version contains all 150 levels and the level editor, which requires a disk drive.

Reception
Lode Runner was very successful. It was Broderbund's second best-selling Commodore game as of late 1987, and sales had surpassed 300,000 copies by August 1984. Computer Gaming World held a contest for the best reader-built level.

Softline in 1983 praised Lode Runner, calling it "smooth, thoughtful, and quite addictive". The magazine approved of its large number of unique levels, level editor ("the possibilities are astounding"), and emphasis on "wits and strategy" over violence. Computer Gaming World praised Lode Runners unusually easy-to-use level editor and the strategy necessary for an arcade title, describing it as "one of the few thinking men's arcade games". Praises for the introduction of strategy into the "climbing game" genre and for the intuitive level editor were repeated in Video magazine's review of the game as well as praise for its graphics and animation, with the Apple II version being described as "stand[ing] out far ahead of the pack".

Ahoy! in 1984 called the game "a top-notch action game that requires both a quick mind and an agile joystick". With the "easy-to-use game generator", the magazine concluded that "Lode Runner is one of the best games available for the C-64. Unconditionally and wholeheartedly recommended". PC Magazine gave the game 16.25 out of 18 points. The magazine called the game "a tour de force of American ingenuity ... the first release in a long, long time that can honestly bear the title, 'computer game' ... Lode Runner uses the power of the PC to create something much more than a video version of Ping Pong. This game requires thought, too". The magazine praised the IBM PC version's graphics, increasingly difficult level design, and the level editor. The Commodore 64 Home Companion said that "there's lots of education hidden in" the level editor, concluding that Lode Runner "is one of the first of a new breed of computer game that lets the player be a creator".

By 1985, the game was still selling well, with Video magazine reporting that it was the 6th best-selling recreational title in March and April of that year. Zzap!64 called the Commodore 64 version "not one of the most recent games but certainly one of the best ... a classic for a long time to come ... graphically minuscule and aurally crude, the game's sheer addiction kept my eyes propped open until the owls went to bed".

In 1984, Lode Runner was awarded "1984 Computer Game of the Year" at the 5th annual Arkie Awards. Judges praised its "outstanding design", and described it as "fascinating", "irresistible", and as "the thinking player's climbing conquest". Softline readers named Lode Runner the most popular Apple and fourth most-popular Atari program of 1983. In 1993 the Spectrum version of the game was voted number 37 in the Your Sinclair Official Top 100 Games of All Time. GameSpot named Lode Runner as one of the "Greatest Games of All Time". In 1996, Computer Gaming World declared Lode Runner the 80th-best computer game ever released. Time in 2010 rated Lode Runner #1 game in "The 10 Greatest Games for the Apple II" list. Game Informer placed the game 52nd on their top 100 video games of all time in 2001.

Orson Scott Card wrote in Compute! in 1989 that its editor was the first game that let him and his family express their creativity through gaming. Tetris designer Alexey Pajitnov stated in 2008 that Lode Runner was his favorite puzzle game for many years.

Legacy

Arcade
In 1984, Irem developed an arcade conversion of Lode Runner. It contains 24 remixed levels from the 150 original levels. Irem brought many of its arcade inspired levels to the Famicom Disk System with the names Super Lode Runner and Super Lode Runner II. In Japan, Game Machine listed Lode Runner on their August 1, 1984 issue as being the most successful table arcade cabinet of the month. The arcade version has numerous sequels, including these:

 Lode Runner: The Bungeling Strikes Back (1984), selecting 30 levels based on the original game developed for the arcade. The gameplay is almost exactly the same (save the addition of a two-player mode) and the only heavy modification was the graphics and advancement to a 512-color palette. In Japan, Game Machine listed Lode Runner: The Bungeling Strikes Back on their March 1, 1985 issue as the seventh most successful table arcade unit of the month.
 Lode Runner: Majin No Fukkatsu (1985), also known as Lode Runner: The Golden Labyrinth, developed by Irem. In Japan, Game Machine listed it on their December 15, 1985 issue as the top-grossing table arcade unit during that month. It went on to be Japan's ninth highest-grossing table arcade game during the first half of 1986.
 Lode Runner: Teikoku Karano Dasshutsu (1986)
 Lode Runner: The Dig Fight (2000)

1990s
 Lode Runner: The Lost Labyrinth, 1990 updated version for the Turbografx-16 PC Engine featuring all 150 levels of the 1983 set.
 Lode Runner: The Legend Returns, a 1994 Sierra incarnation of the original game with enhanced graphics and tools.
 Lode Runner Online: Mad Monks' Revenge, the 1995 remake which replaced all the elements of the previous plus new online play.
 Lode Runner 2 (1998), a game with isometric 3D gameplay.
 Lode Runner (1998), a compilation game for PlayStation, which includes Lode Runner: The Legend Returns and Lode Runner Extra.
 Lode Runner 3-D (1999) for the Nintendo 64.

Several versions of Lode Runner were not released in the U.S., such as Lode Runner Twin and Power Lode Runner (1999, SFC), which vary gameplay, mostly by adding different characters and scenarios. Another title, Battle Lode Runner, was originally exclusive to Japan, but made available on 23 April 2007 as the first Japan-only game to appear on Nintendo's Virtual Console service. The original Lode Runner followed in June 2007. There is also a Cubic Lode Runner, a 3-D Lode Runner variant released only in Japan for the GameCube and PlayStation 2.

The NES version, developed by Hudson Soft, marked the first appearance of Bombermen as the opposing robots. The end screen to Bomberman for the NES notes that the original White Bomberman has turned human and hints at his appearance in another game, with the Lode Runner behind him. In the Japanese version, the reference is more direct: "Congratulations - Bomber Man becomes Runner - See you again in Lode Runner".

In Japan, the Famicom version of Lode Runner allows editing and creating levels to share with friends using a Famicom Data Recorder.

Hudson Soft released a version of Lode Runner for Nintendo DS in 2006.

An unreleased version of the game for the Atari Lynx was discovered in 2008 on an old Atari Corp. hard drive.

2000s

A remake of Lode Runner, developed by Tozai and Southend Interactive, was released on April 22, 2009. The game features revamped 3D graphics, additional game modes, cooperative and competitive multiplayer support, six new block types and a level editor, as well as live leaderboards and a timeline of the game's history.

2010s
Lode Runner Classic was made available as an Xbox Live enhanced game for Windows Phone 7 series of phones on July 18, 2012. It features the graphics, gameplay, and 150 levels from the original Lode Runner game. Lode Runner Classic was released for iOS and Android phones on January 17, 2013.

2020s
A new Lode Runner game has been announced for the Intellivision Amico. It is being made in partnership between Intellivision Entertainment and Tozai Games.

Dion Olsthoorn licensed the original Lode Runner from Tozai to create a version for the Atari 2600. The ZeroPage Homebrew channel featured the gameplay and an interview with the programmer on their Twitch Livestream on October 8, 2022.

See also
 Mr. Robot and His Robot Factory (1984)
 Ultimate Wizard (1984)
 Ladder (video game) (1982)

References

External links
 
 
 
 Lode Runner can be played for free in the browser 
 The Lode Runner Museum

1983 video games
Amstrad CPC games
Apple II games
Arcade video games
Atari 2600 games
Atari 8-bit family games
Atari ST games
Broderbund games
BBC Micro and Acorn Electron games
Cancelled Atari Lynx games
Commodore 64 games
VIC-20 games
DOS games
Game Boy games
FM-7 games
Classic Mac OS games
Mobile games
MSX games
NEC PC-6001 games
NEC PC-8001 games
NEC PC-8801 games
NEC PC-9801 games
Nintendo Entertainment System games
Super Nintendo Entertainment System games
Puzzle-platform games
PlayStation (console) games
SG-1000 games
Sharp MZ games
Sharp X1 games
TurboGrafx-16 games
Virtual Console games
Virtual Console games for Wii U
Windows games
WonderSwan games
Nintendo DS games
Xbox 360 Live Arcade games
ZX Spectrum games
Southend Interactive games
Video games developed in the United States
Android (operating system) games
Single-player video games
Video game level editors
Video games with user-generated gameplay content
Ariolasoft games
SystemSoft Alpha games